The NBA's free agency period began on August 2 at 6 P.M. EST.

Players would be allowed to sign new offers starting on August 6 at 12 p.m. ET, after the moratorium ended.

Free agents 

* Player option
** Team option
*** Early termination option

Notes

References

External links
 NBA player transactions at NBA.com

Transactions
2021-22